A homeland for the Jewish people is an idea rooted in Jewish history, religion, and culture. The Jewish aspiration to return to Zion, generally associated with divine redemption, has suffused Jewish religious thought since the destruction of the First Temple and the Babylonian exile.

History

In the early 19th century, the Napoleonic Wars led to the idea of Jewish emancipation.

In the late 19th century, Theodor Herzl, who saw contemporary antisemitism as a reaction to Jewish emancipation, set out his vision of the restoration of a Jewish state and sovereign homeland for the Jewish nation in his book Der Judenstaat. Herzl was later hailed by the Zionist political parties as the founding father of the State of Israel.

Although persecution of Jews was not limited to Europe, the modern movement for the creation of a secular homeland was perceived as a solution to the especially widespread antisemitism within Europe. This became a centerpiece of secular political Zionism.

The modern legal attempts to establish a national homeland for the Jewish people began in 1839 with a petition by Moses Montefiore to Sa'id of Egypt for a Jewish homeland in the region of Palestine.

In the Balfour Declaration, the United Kingdom became the first world power to endorse the establishment in Palestine of a "national home for the Jewish people." The British government confirmed this commitment by accepting the British Mandate for Palestine in 1922 (along with their colonial control of the Pirate Coast, Southern Coast of Persia, Iraq and from 1922 a separate area called Transjordan, all of the Middle-Eastern territory except the French territory). The European powers mandated the creation of a Jewish homeland at the San Remo conference of 19–26 April 1920. In 1948, the State of Israel was established.

Zionists worked within the existing international legal framework, obtaining international legal rights in 1922.  They also armed and defended themselves.

Relation to Zionism

The Zionist movement was preceded by several Jewish groups that had already popularized the move to the Land of Israel. For example, Israel ben Pereẓ of Polotsk and hundreds of other Jewish groups settled in Israel from Europe, developing communities in Jerusalem, Hebron and around much of the country.  This was in addition to the already existing communities of Sephardi and Ashkenazim in Tiberias, Tsfat and across the rest of the Jewish "Holy Land".

In 1896, Theodor Herzl set out his vision of a Jewish state and homeland for the Jewish people in his book Der Judenstaat. He then proceeded to found the World Zionist Organization.

The draft of the objective of the modern Zionist movement submitted to the First Zionist Congress of the Zionist Organization in 1897 read: "Zionism seeks to establish a home for the Jewish people in Palestine secured under public law." One delegate sought to insert the phrase "by international law", which was opposed by others. A compromise formula was adopted, which came to be known as the Basel program, and read:

Zionism aims at establishing for the Jewish people a publicly and legally assured home in Palestine.

The Sykes–Picot Agreement of 16 May 1916 set aside the region of Palestine for "international administration" under British control. The first official use of the phrase "national home for the Jewish people" was in the Balfour Declaration, the final version of which referred to:
the establishment in Palestine of a national home for the Jewish people.

The phrase "national home" was intentionally used instead of "state" because of opposition to the Zionist program within the British Cabinet. The initial draft of the declaration referred to the principle "that Palestine should be reconstituted as the National Home of the Jewish people."

In 1919 the general secretary (and future President) of the Zionist Organization, Nahum Sokolow, published a History of Zionism (1600–1918) He also represented the Zionist Organization at the Paris Peace Conference. He explained:
The object of Zionism is to establish for the Jewish people a home in Palestine secured by public law. "... It has been said and is still being obstinately repeated by anti-Zionists again and again, that Zionism aims at the creation of an independent "Jewish State" But this is wholly fallacious. The "Jewish State" was never part of the Zionist programme. The Jewish State was the title of Herzl's first pamphlet, which had the supreme merit of forcing people to think. This pamphlet was followed by the first Zionist Congress, which accepted the Basle programme – the only programme in existence."

Britain officially committed itself to the objective set out in the Balfour Declaration by insisting on its forming the basis of the Mandate of Palestine (which it could have avoided), which was formally approved by the League of Nations in June 1922, and which formalised British rule in Palestine which had started in 1917. The preamble of the Mandate declared:

Whereas the Principal Allied Powers have also agreed that the Mandatory should be responsible for putting into effect the declaration originally made on 2 November 1917, by the Government of His Britannic Majesty, and adopted by the said Powers, in favour of the establishment in Palestine of a national home for the Jewish people...

Other possibilities

After a wave of pogroms in Russia, Joseph Chamberlain offered Theodor Herzl the establishment of a Jewish state in Uganda, East Africa. In 1903 Herzl presented the British Uganda Programm at the Sixth Zionist Congress in Basel.

The Jewish Autonomous Oblast, set up in the Russian Far East in 1934, represented a Soviet approach to providing a Jewish homeland. Another possible option explored by the Soviets was Jewish autonomy in Crimea.

In the late 1930s, the British Zionist League considered a number of other places where a Jewish homeland could be established. The Kimberley region in Australia was considered until the Curtin government (in office 1941–45) rejected the possibility.

With the support of the then Premier of Tasmania, Robert Cosgrove (in office from 1939), Critchley Parker proposed a Jewish settlement at Port Davey, in south west Tasmania. Parker surveyed the area, but his death in 1942 put an end to the idea.

Moves to statehood
In 1942, the Biltmore Program was adopted as the platform of the Zionist Organization, with an explicit call "that Palestine be established as a Jewish Commonwealth." In 1946, the Anglo-American Committee of Inquiry, also known as the Grady-Morrison Committee, noted that the demand for a Jewish State went beyond the obligations of either the Balfour Declaration or the Mandate and had been expressly disowned by the Chairman of the Jewish Agency as recently as 1932.

The United Nations Special Committee on Palestine said the Jewish National Home, which derived from the formulation of Zionist aspirations in the 1897 Basel program has provoked many discussions concerning its meaning, scope and legal character, especially since it had no known legal connotation and there are no precedents in international law for its interpretation. It was used in the Balfour Declaration and in the Mandate, both of which promised the establishment of a "Jewish National Home" without, however, defining its meaning. A statement on "British Policy in Palestine," issued on 3 June 1922 by the Colonial Office, placed a restrictive construction upon the Balfour Declaration. The statement excluded "the disappearance or subordination of the Arabic population, language or customs in Palestine" or "the imposition of Jewish nationality upon the inhabitants of Palestine as a whole", and made it clear that in the eyes of the mandatory Power, the Jewish National Home was to be founded in Palestine and not that Palestine as a whole was to be converted into a Jewish National Home. The Committee noted that the construction, which restricted considerably the scope of the National Home, was made prior to the confirmation of the Mandate by the Council of the League of Nations and was formally accepted at the time by the Executive of the Zionist Organization.
The Partition Resolution of the UN General Assembly died at birth when rejected by the Arabs.  The UNGA has only the power to recommend.

In 1919 Harry Sacher wrote "A Jewish Palestine the Jewish case for a British trusteeship.  In 1920 at San Remo the Allied Principal war powers selected this method.  The Palestine Mandate is the trust agreement.  Evidence of the intention of the settlors of the trust shows it was their intent to permit the Jews to settle immediately but not to rule until the defined territory contained a Jewish population majority and the capability to exercise sovereignty.  Such evidence is the lodestar of the interpretation of the trust.  Legal dominion in the collective political rights to self-determination vested in the Jewish People, the trust beneficiary, partly in 1948 and partly in 1967.

Founding of the State
The concept of a national homeland for the Jewish people in the British Mandate of Palestine was enshrined in Israeli national policy and reflected in many of Israel's public and national institutions. The concept was expressed in the Declaration of the Establishment of the State of Israel on 14 May 1948 and given concrete expression in the Law of Return, passed by the Knesset on 5 July 1950, which declared: "Every Jew has the right to come to this country as an oleh." This was extended in 1970 to include non-Jews with a Jewish grandparent, and their spouses. These declarations were widely condemned and considered racist by Palestinians.

While nowadays the concept of a Jewish homeland almost always means the State of Israel under some variation of its current borders, in the course of Jewish history after ancient Israel and Judah there have been other proposals. While some of those have come into existence, others never came to be implemented.

Character of proposed state

There has been ongoing debate in Israel on the character of the state, regarding whether it should enshrine more Jewish culture, encourage Judaism in schools, and enshrine certain laws of Kashrut and Shabbat observance. This debate reflects a historical divide within Zionism and among the Jewish citizens of Israel, which has large secular and traditional/Orthodox minorities as well as a majority of people who lie somewhere in between.

Secular Zionism, the historically dominant stream, is rooted in a concept of the Jews as a people that have a right to self-determination. Another reason sometimes submitted for such establishment was to have a state where Jews would not be afraid of antisemitic attacks and live in peace. But such a reason is not a requirement of the self-determination right and so is subsidiary to it in secular Zionist thinking.

Religious Zionists, who believe that religious beliefs and traditional practices are central to Jewish peoplehood, counter that assimilating to be a secular "nation like any other" would be oxymoronic in nature, and harm more than help the Jewish people.  They seek instead to establish what they see as an "authentic Jewish commonwealth" which preserves and encourages Jewish heritage.
Drawing an analogy to diaspora Jews who assimilated into other cultures and abandoned Jewish culture, whether voluntary or otherwise, they argue that the creation of a secular state in Israel is tantamount to establishing a state where Jews assimilate en masse as a nation, and therefore anathema to what they view as Jewish national aspirations. Zionism is rooted in a concept of the Jews as a nation, in this capacity, they believe that Israel has a mandate to promote Judaism, to be the center of Jewish culture and center of its population, perhaps even the sole legitimate representative of Jews worldwide.

Partisans of the first view are predominantly, though by no means exclusively, secular or less traditional.  Partisans of the second view are almost exclusively traditional or Orthodox, although they also include supporters who follow other streams of Judaism or are less traditional but conservative and would not object to a more prominent state role in promoting Jewish beliefs – although not to the point of creating a purely Halachic state.

The debate is therefore characterised by significant polarities.  Secular and religious Zionists argue passionately about what a Jewish state should represent. Post-Zionists and Zionists argue about whether a Jewish state should exist at all. Because Israel was created within the sphere of international law as the instrument for Jewish self-determination, these polarities are captured by the questions such as, "should Israel maintain and strengthen its status as a state for the Jewish people, or become a state purely for "all of its citizens", or identify as both? And, if both, how to resolve any tensions that arise from their coexistence?. To date, Israel has steered a course between secularism and Jewish identity, usually depending on who controls the Israeli High Court of Justice.

On 19 November 2008, Israeli Foreign Minister Tzipi Livni addressed the United Jewish Communities General Assembly in Jerusalem. In her speech, she argued: "These two goals of Israel as a Jewish and a democratic state must coexist and not contradict each other. So, what does that mean, a Jewish state? It is not only a matter of the number of Jews who live in Israel. It is not just a matter of numbers but a matter of values. The Jewish state is a matter of values, but it is not just a matter of religion, it is also a matter of nationality. And a Jewish state is not a monopoly of rabbis. It is not. It is about the nature of the State of Israel. It is about Jewish tradition. It is about Jewish history, regardless of the question of what each and every Israeli citizen does in his own home on Saturdays and what he does on the Jewish holidays. We need to maintain the nature of the State of Israel, the character of the State of Israel, because this is the raison d'etre of the State of Israel."

According to a 11 January 2019 article in Haaretz, Justice Esther Hayut, the President of the High Court of Justice, announced that eleven justices would be debating the "legality" of the July 2018 Basic Law: Israel as the Nation-State of the Jewish People, also known as the Nation-state law, including its "historical stipulations".

Notes

See also
 Proposals for a Jewish state
 Jewish Autonomous Oblast
Jewish and democratic state
Jewish state
 Land of Israel / Palestine
 History of Israel / History of the Palestinian people
 Binational solution
 Jewish Agency for Israel
 1947 UN Partition Plan
 Christian Zionism

References

Further reading
 Shatz, Adam, "We Are Conquerors" (review of Tom Segev, A State at Any Cost: The Life of David Ben-Gurion, Head of Zeus, 2019, 804 pp.), London Review of Books, vol. 41, no. 20 (24 October 2019), pp. 37–38, 40–42. "Segev's biography... shows how central exclusionary nationalism, war and racism were to Ben-Gurion's vision of the Jewish homeland in Palestine, and how contemptuous he was not only of the Arabs but of Jewish life outside Zion. [Liberal Jews] may look at the state that Ben-Gurion built, and ask if the cost has been worth it." (p. 42 of Shatz's review.)

External links
 Jewish State.com Zionism, News, Links
 Israeli Jewish scene from ynetnews
 Israel as a Jewish state from the Jerusalem Center for Public Affairs
 'Israel a Jewish state first', says former High Court Justice Dalia Dorner

Zionism
Land of Israel
Jewish nationalism
Jewish Agency for Israel
Jewish settlement schemes